Dracaena ballyi is a species of succulent plant native to Kenya and Tanzania. It grows in small rosettes with leaves that have bands of color and sharp tips. Originally collected by Peter Bally in 1963 and long cultivated as a houseplant, it was scientifically described in 2004.

References 

ballyi
Plants described in 2004